This is a list of airports in Austria, sorted by location



Airports 

Airport names shown in bold indicate the airport has scheduled service on commercial airlines.

See also 
 Transport in Austria
 Austrian Air Force
 List of airports by ICAO code: L#LO – Austria
 Wikipedia: WikiProject Aviation/Airline destination lists: Europe#Austria

References 
 
 
  – includes IATA codes
  – ICAO codes and coordinates
  – IATA codes, ICAO codes and coordinates
  – IATA codes and coordinates
 Airport records for Austria at Landings.com. Retrieved 2013-08-06

 
Austria
Airports
Aviation in Austria
Airports
Austria